The Grosses Engelhorn is a mountain of the Bernese Alps, located west of Innertkirchen in the Bernese Oberland. It is one of the highest summits of the Engelhörner, the chain between the Reichenbachtal and the Urbachtal.

References

External links

 Grosses Engelhorn on Hikr

Bernese Alps
Mountains of the Alps
Mountains of Switzerland
Oberhasli
Mountains of the canton of Bern
Two-thousanders of Switzerland